The Adventures of Anton (Polish:Przygody pana Antoniego) is a 1913 Polish silent comedy film directed by Wiktor Biegański and starring Antoni Siemaszko and Wanda Jarszewska.  It is likely that the film and Biegański's previous production were never put on general release.

Cast
 Antoni Siemaszko as Antoni
 Wanda Jarszewska

References

Bibliography
 Skaff, Sheila. The Law of the Looking Glass: Cinema in Poland, 1896–1939. Ohio University Press, 2008.

1913 films
1913 comedy films
Polish comedy films
Polish silent films
1910s Polish-language films
Films directed by Wiktor Bieganski
Films shot in Poland
Polish black-and-white films